The 2015–16 Central Connecticut Blue Devils men's basketball team represented Central Connecticut State University during the 2015–16 NCAA Division I men's basketball season. The Blue Devils, led by 20th year head coach Howie Dickenman, played their home games at the William H. Detrick Gymnasium and were members of the Northeast Conference. They finished the season 4–25, 3–15 in NEC play to finish in last place. They failed to qualify for the NEC tournament.

On February 18, head coach Howie Dickenman announced he would retire at the end of the season. He finished at Central Connecticut with a 20-year record of 281–311.

Roster

Schedule

|-
!colspan=9 style="background:#1F24B4; color:#C0C0C0;"| Exhibition

|-
!colspan=9 style="background:#1F24B4; color:#C0C0C0;"| Non-conference regular season

|-
!colspan=9 style="background:#1F24B4; color:#C0C0C0;"| Northeast Conference Regular Season

References

Central Connecticut Blue Devils men's basketball seasons
Central Connecticut
Central Connecticut Blue Devils men's basketball
Central Connecticut Blue Devils men's basketball